Events from the year 1982 in North Korea.

Incumbents
Premier: Li Jong-ok 
Supreme Leader: Kim Il-sung

Events
1982 North Korean parliamentary election

Births
 7 May - Nam Song-chol.
 12 September - Kim Chol-su.
 13 September - Han Jong-chol.

References

 
1980s in North Korea
Years of the 20th century in North Korea